Haupt's Mill Covered Bridge was a historic covered bridge located in Springfield Township, Bucks County, Pennsylvania. It crossed Durham Creek. Built in 1872 in the town truss style, the bridge was 107 feet long and 15 feet wide.

It was added to the National Register of Historic Places on December 1, 1980.  It was destroyed by arson in January 1985, and subsequently removed from the National Register of Historic Places.

References

Covered bridges in Pennsylvania
Covered bridges in Bucks County, Pennsylvania
Bridges in Bucks County, Pennsylvania
Bridges completed in 1872
Wooden bridges in Pennsylvania
Lattice truss bridges in the United States
Road bridges in Pennsylvania
Covered bridges in the United States destroyed by arson
Former National Register of Historic Places in Pennsylvania